Outpost is a fixed shooter for the Apple II programmed by Tom McWilliams and published by Sirius Software in 1981. It is a variant of the arcade game Space Zap. 

In March 1982, NBC News reported that Outpost earned McWilliams, then still a teenager, at least US$60,000.

Legacy
According to Tim Skelly, the Cinematronics port of Outpost which was being worked on by Scott Boden was reworked after their departure from Cinematronics as the more cutesy title Boxing Bugs by Jack Ritter, which both Skelly and Boden considered a "travesty".

References

External links
 
 Outpost at Giant Bomb

1981 video games
Apple II games
Apple II-only games
Fixed shooters
Sirius Software games
Video game clones
Video games developed in the United States